Aécio de Borba Vasconcelos (6 April 1931 – 24 March 2021) was a Brazilian politician who served as a Deputy from 1983 to 1995 and 1997–1998.

References

1931 births
2021 deaths
Brazilian politicians